Louis Fortier  (25 October 1953 – 4 October 2020) was a biologist and oceanographer from Québec, Canada.

Career 
Fortier studied at the Laval and McGill Universities. He was project manager for the Amundsen Arctic research project, and scientific Director of ArcticNet. In 2013 he held the Canada Research Chair on the Response of Arctic Marine Ecosystems to Climate Change at Laval University.

Fortier died of complications resulting from treatment for leukemia on 4 October 2020, aged 66.

Awards 
 2012 – Timothy R. Parsons Award for excellence in Ocean Sciences
 2012 – Garfield Weston Family Prize for Lifetime Achievement in Northern Research
 2010 – Prix Armand-Frappier du Québec for Excellence in Research and Research Development
 2009 – Stefansson Medal of the Explorers Club
 2008 – Personnalité scientifique by Le Soleil and Radio-Canada 
 2008 – Officer of the National Order of Quebec
 2007 – Honorary PhD, University of Manitoba
 2007 – Officer of the Order of Canada
 2006 – Grand Diplomé and Gloire de l’Escolle Medal of the Alumni Association of Université Laval
 2005 – «Personnalité scientifique de l'Année» by La Presse and Radio-Canada
 2004 – «Scientifique de l’Année» by Radio-Canada

References

1953 births
2020 deaths
Canadian marine biologists
Canadian oceanographers
Deaths from leukemia
French Quebecers
Officers of the Order of Canada
Officers of the National Order of Quebec
Canada Research Chairs
Université Laval alumni
Academic staff of Université Laval
McGill University alumni